Amolops archotaphus, also known as the Doi Inthanon rock frog (Doi Inthanon mountain  being its type locality), is a species of frog in the family Ranidae. It is endemic to Chiang Mai Province in northwestern Thailand, although its range might extend into adjacent eastern Myanmar. Earlier records from Laos have been described as a separate species, Amolops compotrix. Amolops archotaphus itself was "hidden" as a cryptic species within the "Odorrana livida complex" until 1997, and was reassigned to Amolops in 2008.

It is threatened by habitat destruction and degradation, particularly agriculture, development of infrastructure, logging and water pollution. The Doi Inthanon population is protected by the Doi Inthanon National Park.

References

archotaphus
Amphibians of Thailand
Endemic fauna of Thailand
Taxa named by Robert F. Inger
Amphibians described in 1997
Taxa named by Tanya Chan-ard
Taxonomy articles created by Polbot